Stanly County Schools (abbreviated SCS) is a local education agency headquartered in Albemarle, North Carolina and is the public school system for Stanly County.  With over 1,350 employees, Stanly County Schools is the largest employer in Stanly County, North Carolina serving more than 8,700 students in grades PK – 12.

Governance
The Stanly County Schools Board of Education, or school board, consists of 7 members—2 at-large and 5 from districts.  Members serve staggered four-year terms; the at-large members are elected in the year before presidential elections and the district members are elected in the year after presidential elections.

Schools

High schools
Albemarle High School "Bulldogs"
North Stanly High School "Comets"
South Stanly High School "Rebel Bulls"
Stanly Academy Learning Center "Eagles"
Stanly Early College "Tigers"
West Stanly High School "Colts"

Middle schools
Albemarle Middle School "Bulldogs
North Stanly Middle School "Comets"
South Stanly Middle School "Rebels"
West Stanly Middle School "Colts"

Elementary schools
Aquadale Elementary "Little Bulls"
Badin Elementary "Watts"
Central Elementary "Bulldogs"
East Albemarle Elementary "Bullpups"
Endy Elementary"Redskins"
Locust Elementary "Colts
Millingport Elementary "Wildcats"
Norwood Elementary "Patriots"
Oakboro Choice STEM Elementary School "Eagles"
Richfield Elementary "Tigers"
Stanfield Elementary "Wildcats"

References

External links
Stanly County Schools' NC Report Card

Education in Stanly County, North Carolina
School districts in North Carolina